Framed is a 1927 American drama film directed by Charles Brabin and written by Mary O'Hara. The film stars Milton Sills, Natalie Kingston, E. J. Ratcliffe, Charles K. Gerrard, Edward Peil Sr. and Burr McIntosh. The film was released on June 19, 1927, by First National Pictures.

Cast      
Milton Sills as Etienne Hilaire
Natalie Kingston as Diane Laurens
E. J. Ratcliffe as Alphonse Laurens
Charles K. Gerrard as Arthur Remsen
Edward Peil Sr. as Moola
Burr McIntosh as Magistrate
Natli Barr as Lola
John Miljan as Lola's Husband

References

External links
 

1927 films
1920s English-language films
Silent American drama films
1927 drama films
First National Pictures films
Films directed by Charles Brabin
American silent feature films
American black-and-white films
1920s American films